President Roxas, officially the Municipality of President Roxas, is a 1st class municipality in the province of Cotabato, Philippines. According to the 2020 census, it has a population of 52,512 people.

History
President Roxas as a municipality came into and had its legal existence on May 8, 1967 when Republic Act No. 4869 was finally approved and signed into law by the President of the Republic, Ferdinand E. Marcos.

The bill seeking the creation of this municipality was first introduced in the House of Representatives on January 23, 1967 by Hon. Salipada K. Pendatun, representative of entire province of Cotabato. It was then passed and approved in the House of Senate on February 13, 1967. 
 
Most of the territories comprising the new municipality were formerly part of Kidapawan, the mother municipality extending up to the borders of Bukidnon are the vast Arakan plains, which could boast of its rich and fertile valley suitable for agricultural crops such as rubber, coffee, sugar cane, palay and corn.

Barrio Kabacan, renamed Barrio President Roxas that eventually became the seat of the municipal government was an insignificant area before 1951. In fact, it was Barrio Labuo, where the Manobo Chieftain, Datu Guabong Linog resided with his people who was thriving the area even before the outbreak of the World War II. The Manobo natives have learned to co- exist with the settlers from Visayas and Luzon. After the war, floods of emigrants from different parts of the country continued to arrive at a much faster rate so that by 1957, they had occupied almost all the vast fertile land of the Arakan plains. By this time settlers of Barrio President Roxas had bonded together into an organization called “La castellana home seekers Association” whose membership were mostly people from Negros Occidental. This group helped enhanced the rapid development of the area outpacing the rest of the earlier settlements.

In the early 1960s, Barrio President Roxas became a booming logging community. The concessionaires constructed logging roads extending beyond the Arakan Valley, making it the center of commerce and Agriculture. In the early part of 1970, the road, which was constructed by logging companies stationed at Poblacion was utilized as the main route of transportation in going out to Kidapawan passing Barangay Tuael through Barangay Binay and Poblacion of the Municipality of Magpet. It was in 1967 when the National Highway at km. 114 Paco, Kidapawan was opened. This project propelled the growth of programs and development in the area. Mobility of the people became easy not only in President Roxas but also of the entire Arakan Valley which is composed of five (5) municipalities.

Geography
The municipality of President Roxas is composed of two parts: the northern and the southern part.

The Northern President Roxas is bounded by the Municipalities of Damulog and Kibawe of the province of Bukidnon on the north, on the south by the Municipality of Antipas, on the west by the Municipality of Carmen and on the east by the Municipality of Arakan.

Meanwhile, the Southern President Roxas is bounded on the north by the Municipality of Antipas, on the south by Kidapawan, on the west by Matalam and on the east by the Municipality of Magpet.

Barangays
President Roxas is politically subdivided into 25 barangays.

Climate

Demographics

Economy

Industries
 Banana chip making
 Fish crackers
 Sandal making
 Macaroni chips
 Native chicken production

References

External links
  President Roxas Profile at the DTI Cities and Municipalities Competitive Index
[ Philippine Standard Geographic Code]
Philippine Census Information

Municipalities of Cotabato
Populated places on the Rio Grande de Mindanao